In English, red tea normally refers to rooibos tea.

Red tea may also refer to:

Black tea, which is referred to in various Asian languages as 紅茶 (literally "red tea")
The completely oxidized bud leaves of Camellia sinensis from which black tea is made
Hibiscus tea, tisane made from sepals of Hibiscus sabdariffa
Red Tea, a 1859 English-language novel by Paul Harris Daniel
White methane methamphetamine (slang)